Super Xuxa contra Baixo Astral (known internationally as Super Xuxa versus the Down Mood and in the United States as Super Xuxa vs. Satan) is a 1988 Brazilian film directed by Anna Penido and David Sonneschein, and starring Xuxa Meneghel.

Produced in 1988 by Dreamvision, with co-production of Diler & Associados and Riofilme, executive produced the position of Lael Rodrigues, the same as Bete Balanço. Marked the first production of the partnership between the producer Diler Trindade and Xuxa, who then made together films like Lua de Cristal, and more recently, Xuxa Gêmeas. The film had theatrical distribution by Luis Severiano Ribeiro and Columbia Pictures and was released with 93 cinemas of Brazil, on June 30, 1988.

Plot 
Xuxa arouses the anger of the villain Baixo Astral when you call children to a campaign to color the world. The villain then kidnaps her dog Xuxo, which have to face frequent harassment of Titica and Morcegão, assistant Baixo Astral, which at all times ask the boss can torutá it. To retrieve the dog, Xuxa faces several traps. Accompanied by Xixa caterpillar, jumps the fence of illusions, crosses the river of delusion, but struggles a bit with complicated words used by Cascadura grandmother, a turtle that lives under the tree of knowledge. Xuxa escapes the bureaucracy of the web mounted Morcegão and comes to urban waste, Kingdom of Baixo Astral. In the final duel between Xuxa and the Baixo Astral, the girl almost slide to the other side, but is saved by Rafa, a boy who knows the Lower Astral and realize it's not on this side that wants to stay. Xuxa, Rafa, Xuxo and Xixa return to the realm of Alto Astral after destroy the villain and convert Titica and Morcegão.

Cast 
Xuxa Meneghel .... Super Xuxa
Nair Amorim .... Xuxo
Guilherme Karan .... Baixo Astral
Jonas Torres .... Rafa
Paolo Paceli .... Titica
Roberto Guimarães .... Morcegão
Henriqueta Brieba .... Vovó Cascadura
Luis Carlos Tourinho .... Pássaro da Árvore da Consciência

Production 
The film was directed by Anna Penido and David Sonnenschein, who worked as co-director but was later unbilled based on a false legal challenge of not being unionized as a non-Brazilian citizen (he had already become a legal resident and joined the union). Penido also wrote the script, with the help of fellow TV-writer Antonio Calmon. The movie is accused of being based on Jim Henson's Labyrinth, released two years before. The film was the last credited work of Lael Rodrigues, who would die of acute pancreatitis the following year.

Reception

Response 
The film opened during the winter break in 1988, and received great response by audiences. It was the third most watched movie in 1988, and the most watched Brazilian movie that year. Critical response was mixed: some praised its creativity, some said it abused merchandising and had a weak plot. The movie cost US$1 million to make. Over 3 million people paid to watch it when it opened.

Critical reception
The Spinning Image says, "while simplistic (this is a kids' movie, after all), the core message that only education can enable young people to overthrow oppression and achieve true freedom is both potent and heartening. That it is delivered in the form of a pop song performed by a sexily gyrating supermodel is simply a bonus."

International release 
After Lua de Cristal (Crystal Moon), another film starring Xuxa, in 1990, had achieved a huge success both in Brazil (it was the most watched Brazilian movie until 2001) and other Latin American countries, the movie was released in Argentina as Super Xuxa Vs. Bajo Astral, with some success. It's available in the U.S. in non-authorized copies as Super Xuxa Vs. Satan.

Soundtrack 

The soundtrack consists of songs performed by Xuxa Meneghel and other artists.

Track listing
Arco-Íris
Flexionar
Ei Machão
Túnel do Terror
Sonho (Sandra de Sá)
Voar Voar (Trem da Alegria)
Alto Astral
Burocracia
Eu Quero Saber
Somos Um Só
Voar Voar (instrumental)

Certifications

DVD 
In 2001 the film was released in DVD by Som Livre. The extras include a making-of featurette, a special karaoke soundtrack for the songs and subtitles in English and Spanish. But the DVD was criticised for having bad sound and video quality.

Awards 
Fantasporto (1989) 
 International Fantasy Film Award (Best Film, nomination)

See also 
 List of Brazilian films of the 1980s

References

External links 
 

1980s musical comedy films
Brazilian adventure films
Brazilian children's films
Brazilian comedy films
1988 comedy films
1988 films
1980s Portuguese-language films